Banda Daud Shash is Headquarter of BD Shah Tehsil a tehsil located in Karak District, Khyber Pakhtunkhwa, Pakistan. The populationof Tehsil  is 155,642 according to the 2017 census.
Gained Tehsil status in 1882.Leis on Ter toi , Teri Town in West Wardak village in East.

See also 
 List of tehsils of Khyber Pakhtunkhwa

References 

Tehsils of Khyber Pakhtunkhwa
Populated places in Karak District